Juan Matías Succar Cañote (born 16 February 1999) is a Peruvian footballer who plays as a forward for Peruvian club Carlos A. Mannucci.

Club career

Youth career
Succar started as a goalkeeper in 2006 at Country Club Villa, in the Chorrillos District of his hometown Lima, Peru. He then moved to changed position to left-back, and then a left midfielder, before joining Cantolao San Borja. Aged 14, he moved to Academia Cantolao where he became a striker. He didn't play much, and left football for one year. Succar returned to play when he was 16 year old and scored 26 goals in his first season.

Deportivo Municipal
In 2016, 17-year old Succar joined Deportivo Municipal, where he began playing for the clubs reserve team.

At the age of 18, Succar was promoted to the first team squad. He made his senior debut on 28 October 2017, in a Peruvian Primera División game against Universidad de San Martín, where his older brother Alexander was in the starting lineup for the opponents. Matías Succar started on the bench, but replaced Rodrigo Cuba after 68 minutes, the same minute his brother was subbed off. The game was his first and last of season. The following season, Succar played six games.

Loan to Unión Comercio 
In the search of more continuity, Succar was loaned out to Unión Comercio for the 2018 season. The deal was later extended until the summer 2019. He then returned to Municipal after 25 games and five goals for Comercio.

Return to Deportivo Municipal 
After returning to Municipal, Succar found more continuity, scoring three important goals in 16 games, to help save Municipal from relegation. From the 2020 season, he became a regular starter and scored five goals in his first 10 league games.

LASK and Juniors OÖ
On 12 January 2021, Succar moved to Austrian Football Bundesliga club LASK on a deal until June 2024. He made his debut for their reserve team, Juniors OÖ, in the Second League, as a 78th-minute substitute against Horn.

Teplice
On 7 September 2021, he joined Teplice in the Czech Republic on loan for the 2021–22 season.

Carlos A. Mannucci
On 5 July 2022, he signed for Peruvian club Carlos A. Mannucci.

International career
Succar's paternal great grandparents immigrated to Peru from Lebanon by boat. Thus, Succar is of Lebanese descent and is eligible to be selected for their national team. He can also play for the United States due to his fathers nationality, and for Peru due to his citizenship.

In September 2019, Matías and his older brother, Alexander, were contacted by the Lebanese Football Association to play the 2022 FIFA World Cup qualification. They both refused to play for Lebanon. In June 2020, Succar revealed that he was going to fight for a place on the Peruvian national team.

At the end of August 2020, Succar was on the list of those summoned to the training sessions of the Peru national team. Previously, he was part of some training sessions for the under-18 and under-20 teams.

References

External links
 

Living people
1999 births
Footballers from Lima
Peruvian footballers
Peruvian people of Lebanese descent
Sportspeople of Lebanese descent
Association football forwards
Academia Deportiva Cantolao players
Deportivo Municipal footballers
Unión Comercio footballers
LASK players
FC Juniors OÖ players
FK Teplice players
Peruvian Primera División players
2. Liga (Austria) players
Czech First League players
Peruvian expatriate footballers
Peruvian expatriate sportspeople in Austria
Peruvian expatriate sportspeople in the Czech Republic
Expatriate footballers in Austria
Expatriate footballers in the Czech Republic